The 21st season of Arthur aired on PBS Kids in the U.S. from October 24, 2017 to February 15, 2018. John Lewis guest starred on the episode "Arthur Takes a Stand". This is also the last season where Jacob Ursomarzo voices Arthur, Christian Distefano voices D.W. and Max Friedman Cole voices Brain.

Episodes

Voice cast
The following list of voice actors below are the actors for the characters in the 21st season of Arthur:
 Jacob Ursomarzo as Arthur Timothy Read
 Daniel Brochu as Buster Baxter
 Christian Distefano as Dora Winifred Read (A.K.A.  D.W.), James MacDonald
 Jodie Lynn Resther as Francine Alice Frensky
 Mellisa Altro as Mary Alice Crosswire (A.K.A. Muffy)
 Max Friedman-Cole as Alan Powers (A.K.A. The Brain)
 Bruce Dinsmore as Shelley Barnes (A.K.A. Binky), David L. Read (A.K.A. Mr. Read), Bailey Carson Belvedere III
 Sonja Ball as Jane Read (A.K.A. Ms. Read)
 Arthur Holden as Nigel Charles Ratburn (A.K.A. Mr. Ratburn), Bionic Bunny
 Joanna Noyes as Grandma Thora Read
 A.J. Henderson as Grandpa Dave, Edward Edzel Crosswire (A.K.A. Mr. Crosswire and Ed)
 Tamar Koslov as Prunella Deegan
 Jessie Kardos as Sue Ellen Armstrong
 Jake Sim as Tommy Tibble
 Jacob Ewaniuk as Timmy Tibble
 Sally Isherwood as Emily
 Hayley Reynolds as Nadine Flumberghast (D.W.'s imaginary friend)
 Holly Gauthier-Frankel as Fern Walters
 Krystal Meadows as Ladonna Compson
 Eleanor Noble as George Lundgren
 Maggie Castle as Molly MacDonald
 Brigid Tierney as Jenna Morgan
 Robyn Thaler as Catherine Frensky
 Julie Lemieux as Bud Tucker Compson
 Bronwen Mantel as Leah MacGrady (Sara MacGrady before the production of the 13th season)
 Eramelinda Boquer as Rubella Deegan
 Walter Massey as Francis Haney (Herbert Haney before the production of the 11th season), Mr. Marco
 Mark Camacho as Oliver Frensky
 Jane Wheeler as Mrs. Barnes
 Ellen David as Bitzi Lynne Baxter (A.K.A. Mrs. Baxter)
 Katie Hutchison as Paige Turner
 Susan Glover as Mrs. Wood
 Simon Peacock as Pal
 Tracy Braunstein as Baby Kate (A.K.A. Kate Read)
 Michael Yarmush as Slink
 Scott Beaudin as Rattles
 Jonathan Potts as Mr. Compson

Production
Oasis Animation produced the 21st season of Arthur.

Notes

References

External links
 Arthur Season 21 Episodes
 Watch Arthur Season 21 Episodes Online

2017 American television seasons
2018 American television seasons
Arthur (TV series) seasons
2017 Canadian television seasons